There are two species of bird alternatively called the Seychelles parrot:

 Seychelles parakeet, Psittacula wardi
 Seychelles black parrot, Coracopsis barklyi